The Manbij bombing occurred on 16 January 2019 when a suicide bomber targeted a busy market street in Manbij known to be frequented by American soldiers.

Background
In the Syrian Civil War, the city of Manbij was taken by the Free Syrian Army in 2012, and then by ISIS in 2014. In 2016, the city was taken by the American-backed Syrian Democratic Forces in the Manbij offensive.

The Palace of the Princes restaurant was popular with Americans, located on a crowded downtown street in Manbij. U.S. Senators Lindsey Graham and Jeanne Shaheen ate there when they visited Syria in July 2018.

The attack
Several American military personnel were inside the Palace of Princes restaurant when a suicide bomber triggered an explosion outside the restaurant around midday on Wednesday, 16 January 2019. The bomber mixed into a crowd of people visiting a nearby vegetable market and detonated his explosive vest near the restaurant entrance, igniting a fireball that left the dead and wounded scattered in the street. Rescue workers rushed the wounded to the hospital, and military helicopters landed on a nearby soccer field to take the dead and wounded Americans and civilians to medical facilities.

Casualties
The U.S. Department of Defense released a statement on 18 January 2019, identifying their three employees: a soldier, a sailor, and an intelligence expert. Defense contractor Valiant Integrated Services identified one of their employees as the fourth American killed. The four deceased Americans were:
 Army Chief Warrant Officer 2 Jonathan R. Farmer, 37, of Boynton Beach, Florida. Farmer was assigned to 3rd Battalion, 5th Special Forces Group (Airborne), Fort Campbell, Kentucky. 
 Navy Chief Cryptologic Technician (Interpretive) Shannon M. Kent, 35, of upstate New York. Kent was assigned to Cryptologic Warfare Activity 66, based at Fort George G. Meade, Maryland. Her husband was Joe Kent, an army officer who would later run for a U.S. House seat.
 DOD civilian intelligence officer Scott A. Wirtz of St. Louis, Missouri. Wirtz was assigned to the Defense Intelligence Agency as an operations support specialist.
 Civilian contractor Ghadir (Jasmine) Taher of East Point, Georgia. Taher worked for Valiant Integrated Services as an interpreter for U.S. troops in Syria.

The total death toll is believed to be 19, including 15 local SDF fighters. Three other American servicemen were also injured. The Islamic State of Iraq and the Levant claimed responsibility.

Aftermath

U.S. President Donald Trump paid tribute to the fallen Americans during a trip to Dover Air Force Base in the US state of Delaware on 19 January, where their remains were received.

A second joint convoy of U.S. and allied Kurdish forces in northeastern Syria was hit in al-Hasakah 5 days later, there were no casualties, with two Kurdish fighters were lightly wounded in the blast.

References

2019 murders in Syria
Aleppo Governorate in the Syrian civil war
Attacks on buildings and structures in Syria
Attacks on restaurants in Asia
Conflicts in 2019
Crime in Aleppo Governorate
ISIL terrorist incidents in Syria
Islamic terrorist incidents in 2019
January 2019 crimes in Asia
January 2019 events in Syria
Mass murder in 2019
Mass murder in Syria
Suicide bombings in 2019
Suicide bombings in Syria
Terrorist incidents in Asia in 2019
Terrorist incidents in Syria in 2019
Building bombings in Syria